Jason Clive Lloyd is a retired English professional footballer who used to play for the Guyana national football team as a goalkeeper.

His father is notable West Indies cricketer Clive Lloyd.

In August 2010 it was reported that he was on trial with English Football League club Stockport County. He also had a trial at Crewe Alexandra FC in 2006.
He had a brief stint at Sun Sports F.C. in 2014.

Jason Clive Lloyd played the role of cricketer Joel Garner in the bollywood film 83.

References

External links

Living people
1981 births
English footballers
Guyanese footballers
Guyana international footballers
English people of Guyanese descent
Association football goalkeepers
People from Stockport